Irene Chen is an Australian actress based in Melbourne. At age seventeen, she starred in her first feature film, The Home Song Stories, alongside Joan Chen, Joel Lok, Qi Yu Wu, Steven Vidler and Kerry Walker.

Career 
From an early age, Chen's interest in acting blossomed through her participation in speech and drama classes, and various school productions. In 2006, she was cast as "May", the daughter of Rose (Joan Chen), in The Home Song Stories.

Nominations 
AFI Best Supporting Actress
AFI Young Actor Award
FCCA Best Supporting Actress

References

External links 

Living people
Year of birth missing (living people)
Australian film actresses
Australian child actresses
Actresses from Melbourne